The Czechoslovakia Olympic football team was the national under-23 football team of Czechoslovakia from 1922 to 1993, before the country split into the Czech Republic and Slovakia (For information about the national teams of the two countries, see the articles Czech Republic national under-23 football team and Slovakia national under-23 football team.)

Olympic Record 
Since 1992 the Olympic roster may consist out of under-23 year old players, plus three over the age players.

See also 
 Football in Czechoslovakia
 Czechoslovakia national football team
 Czechoslovakia national under-21 football team
 Czechoslovakia national under-19 football team

References

External links
 Official Czech national football team website

European Olympic national association football teams
Oly
Foot